Ponkunnam is a census town in Kerala, India, part of Kottayam district under Kanjirappally taluk. Ponkunnam literally means golden mountain
(ponn = gold, kunn = mountain). Nearby towns are Kanjirappalli, Manimala and Pala. This part of Kerala is famous for its fertile land and rubber plantations.  It is at an altitude of 
 above mean sea level.  The town is at the junction of two major roads in Kerala: NH220 and Main Eastern Highway. The climate is moderate with timely cold breezes and the town is the gateway to the Western Ghats. The town is famous for its volleyball traditions and customs. Almost every year there is an ever-rolling volleyball tournament happening in Ponkunnam Mahatma Gandhi Mini Stadium.

Overview 
Ponkunnam is one of the busiest towns along the NH 220 comprising key administrative institutions of Kanjirappally taluk such as the Kanjirapally Munsif Court, DySP office, and Regional Transport Office. It is a part of Kanjirappally State Legislative constituency and Pathanamthitta Lok Sabha constituency.  The town is also home to many educational institutions and healthcare facilities. Part of the Syrian Christian belt, there are many Syrian Christian agrarian families that reside here.

Religious places 
 Chirakkadavu Mahadeva Temple, is on the way to Manimala, nearly 3 km from Ponkunnam Town.
 Manakkattu Bhadra Temple, is on Ponkunnam - Mannamplavu Road, nearly 4 km from Ponkunnam Town.
 Holy Family Syro Malabar Church - near KSRTC bus station.

 Ponkunnam Puthiyakavu Temple is near the Ponkunnam private bus stand.
 St.Marys Orthodox Church is on the Ponkunnam–Thampalakad road.

 Mosque is near Ponkunnam bus stand & in Manimala road.
 Latin Catholic Church 2 km from the town (westward) by the side of NH 183.
 CMS church half km from the town at Attickal in PP Road.
 Elamgulam Sreedharma Shasta temple and Elagmulam church are 5 km away from the town.
 Panamttom Devi temple (Where the traditional travancore folklore padyani is held every year as a part of temple fest) is 4.5 km from Ponkunnam.

Notable persons
 
 Babu Antony, prominent South Indian film actor
 Bipin Chandran, noted film script-writer from Kerala.
 M. D. Rajendran, Film director
 Ponkunnam Damodaran, Poet from Kerala
 Ponkunnam Varkey, notable writer
 Thampi Antony, an actor and novelist from Kerala

Transport

Road 
Ponkunnam lies on the National Highway 183 (Old NH 220) connecting the City of Kottayam and Theni. The NH183 connects Kottayam to the state of Tamil Nadu. It is one of the busiest roads passing through Ponkunnam.

The Main Eastern Highway  (Punalur- Pathanamthitta- Ponkunnam- Pala- Muvattupuzha) also passes through Ponkunnam. Main Eastern Highway is categorized as State Highway - 08 ( SH-08 ) of Kerala. The districts it passes through are Kollam, Pathanamthitta, Kottayam, Idukki, and Ernakulam. These highways connect Ponkunnam to Muvattupuzha MC Road(SH-01). The two-lane highway, which connects Ponkunnam To Muvattupuzha over  within 80 minutes. This makes it easy to access for the people of Highranges, tourists to Thekkady and pilgrims of Sabarimala to reach Muvattupuzha, Angamaly and Kochi. The Highway becomes congested during the months of November and December due to Sabarimala pilgrims.

There is one KSRTC Bus stand and one private bus stand. Daily, there are many buses to Kottayam, Changanassery, Kochi, Thiruvananthapuram, Thrissur, Kozhikode, Bangalore and also to the nearest towns: Kanjirappally, Erumely etc.
KSRTC operates a chain service to Pala. KSRTC also operates a chain service from Kottayam to Kumily via Ponkunnam.

Railway 
The nearest railway stations are Kottayam (33 km) and Changanassery (38 km).

Air 
The nearest airport is Cochin International Airport, Kochi (94 km).

See also 
 Main Eastern Highway
 Kanjirappally
 Mundakayam.

References

External links
 www.ponkunnamtown.in

Cities and towns in Kottayam district